The Wicked Carabel (Spanish:El malvado Carabel) is a 1956 Spanish comedy film directed and also starred by Fernando Fernán Gómez about a kind and innocent man that after being fired snaps and tries to become a criminal. It was based on a novel by Wenceslao Fernández Flórez.

Plot 
Amaro Carabel (Fernando Fernán Gómez) is an ordinary man with a kind nature who lives with his aunt and is unable to marry his fiancée since his salary is permanently frozen. During a country race organized by his company, Carabel has a well-intentioned but indiscreet talk with one of the clients that leads to his dismissal. He then decides that the cause of his misfortunes lies in having always behaved honestly, and announces to his aunt his intention to become an evil man.

Carabel tries to carry out some misdeeds such as becoming a pickpocket, kidnapping a child, using that same child for begging, robbing a hotel or robbing a passer-by, always with disastrous results. He finally decides to rob the safe from his old company.

Carabel manages to get hold of the safe and take it home, but it is totally impossible for her to open it. Also, his fiancée, Silvia, gives him an ultimatum; she or she fixes her life in 21 days, or she will marry another man.

Knowing that his aunt is taking a correspondence course in hypnosis, Carabel desperately tries to use it to hypnotize her former bosses into giving her the key to the safe. Once there, however, the bosses, who are short of employees, decide to reinstate him in the company (with a reduction in salary). Carabel gladly accepts the offer, but unfortunately the term imposed by Silvia has expired.

Some time passes and while he corrects a letter he reads a message of love addressed to himself, when he looks up he finds that it has been written by Silvia, who has also got a job in the company and finally did not get married after all. Now that they have two salaries, the fiancés will be able to get married and Carabel definitively abandons any malevolent pretense.

Cast
Fernando Fernán Gómez as Amaro Carabel
María Luz Galicia as Silvia
Carmen Sánchez as mother of Silvia
Rafael López Somoza as Gregorio
Julia Caba Alba as Alodia
Joaquín Roa as Cardoso
Rosario García Ortega
Julio Sanjuán as Giner
Fernando Rodríguez Molina as Camí
Manuel Alexandre as Dr. Solás

References

External links 

1956 films
Films based on Spanish novels
Spanish comedy films
1956 comedy films
1950s Spanish-language films
Films directed by Fernando Fernán Gómez
1950s Spanish films
Spanish black-and-white films